Yemeni unification took place on May 22, 1990, when the area of the People's Democratic Republic of Yemen (also known as South Yemen) was united with the Yemen Arab Republic (also known as North Yemen), forming the Republic of Yemen (known as simply Yemen).

Background (1918–1990)
North Yemen became a state in the context of the weakness of the Ottoman Empire in November 1918. Aden, in South Yemen, was administered as part of British India, and in 1937 became a British colony in its own right.  The larger part of South Yemen was a British protectorate, effectively under colonial control. In one of the many proxy conflicts of the Cold War, a South Yemeni insurgency (with the support and backing of the Soviet Union) led by two nationalist parties revolted, causing the United Kingdom to unify the area and in 1967 to withdraw from its former colony.

Following the North Yemen Civil War, the north established a republican government that included tribal representatives. It enjoyed modest oil revenues and remittances from its citizens working in the oil-rich Arab states of the Persian Gulf. Its population in the 1980s was estimated at 12 million as opposed to 3 million in South Yemen.

South Yemen developed as a mostly-secular society ruled first by the National Liberation Front, which later morphed into the ruling Yemeni Socialist Party. The only avowedly communist nation in the Middle East, South Yemen received significant foreign aid and other assistance from the Soviets.

In October 1972, fighting erupted between north and south; North Yemen was supplied by Saudi Arabia, and South Yemen was supplied by the Soviet Union. Fighting was short-lived, and the conflict led to the October 28, 1972 Cairo Agreement, which set forth a plan to unify the two countries.

Fighting broke out again in February and March 1979, with South Yemen allegedly supplying aid to rebels in the north by the National Democratic Front and crossing the border. Southern forces made it as far as the city of Taiz before withdrawing. Again, North Yemen was supported by anticommunist Saudi Arabia and Taiwan, by Saudi Arabia and secretly in the name of the Royal Saudi Air Force from 1979 to 1990. This conflict was also short-lived.

In the late 1980s, oil exploration near the border between the two nations – the Marib Governorate in the North and the Shabwah Governorate in the South – spurred interest in developing agreements to exploit resources there and lift both nations' economies. In May 1988, the two governments came to an understanding that considerably reduced tensions, including agreements to renew discussions concerning unification, to establish a joint oil exploration area along their undefined border, now called the Joint Investment Area, by the Hunt Oil Company and Exxon. The same month, they formed the Yemeni Company for Investment in Mineral and Oil Resources (YCIMOR).

In November 1989, Ali Abdullah Saleh of North Yemen and Ali Salem al Beidh of South Yemen jointly accepted a draft unity constitution originally drawn up in 1981, which included a demilitarized border and border passage by Yemenis on the sole basis of a national identification card and a capital city in Sanaa.

Unification

The Republic of Yemen was declared on 22 May 1990. Ali Abdullah Saleh of the north became Head of State, and Ali Salim al-Beidh of the south became Head of Government. A 30-month transitional period for completing the unification of the two political and economic systems was set. A presidential council was jointly elected by the 26-member Yemen Arab Republic advisory council and the 17-member People's Democratic Republic of Yemen presidium. The presidential council appointed a Prime Minister, who formed a Cabinet. There was also a 301-seat provisional unified parliament, consisting of 159 members from the north, 111 members from the south, and 31 independent members appointed by the chairman of the council.

A unity constitution was agreed upon in May 1990 and ratified by the populace in May 1991. It affirmed Yemen's commitment to free elections, a multiparty political system, the right to own private property, equality under the law, and respect of basic human rights. Parliamentary elections were held on April 27, 1993. International groups assisted in the organization of the elections and observed actual balloting. The resulting Parliament included 143 General People's Congress, 69 Yemeni Socialist Party (YSP), 63 Islah (the nation's largest Islamist party), 6 Ba'athists, 3 Nasserist Unionist People's Organisation, 2 Al Haq, and 15 independents. The new parliament represented the North strongly. The YSP, though it had won the most seats in voting in the less-populated south, was considered a minor part of the new coalition government. The head of Islaah, Abdullah ibn Husayn al-Ahmar, became the speaker of Parliament. Islaah was invited into the ruling coalition, and the presidential council was altered to include one Islaah member.

As a new oil field was brought online in the Hadhramaut Governorate in the south, southerners began to feel that their land, home to the majority of the country's oil reserves, was illegally appropriated as part of a planned conspiracy by the rulers of North Yemen.

Finally, the newly unified nation faced political crisis when an estimated 800,000 Yemeni nationals and overseas workers were sent home by Saudi Arabia following Yemen's decision not to support Coalition forces in the Gulf War. Remittances from these workers, an important part of the economy, were slashed and many Yemenis were placed in refugee camps while the government decided where to house them and how to re-integrate them into the workforce. The repatriation of these Yemenis immediately increased the nation's population by 7%.

Civil war

Conflicts within the coalition resulted in the self-imposed exile of Vice President Ali Salim Al-Beidh to Aden beginning in August 1993 and a deterioration in the general security situation as political rivals settled scores and tribal elements took advantage of the unsettled situation. Haidar Abu Bakr al-Attas, the former Southern Prime Minister continued to serve as the Yemen's Prime Minister, but his government was ineffective due to political infighting. Continuous negotiations between northern and southern leaders resulted in the signing of the document of pledge and accord in Amman, Jordan on February 20, 1994. Despite this, clashes intensified until civil war broke out in early May 1994. Significantly, one of the institutions that had not yet unified was the military arms of both nations.

Southern leaders seceded and established the Democratic Republic of Yemen (DRY) on 21 May 1994, but the new state was not recognized by the international community. Ali Nasir Muhammad, the exiled South Yemen leader, assisted military operations against the secessionists.

Aden was captured on 7 July 1994. Other resistance quickly collapsed and thousands of southern leaders and military went into exile.

In the aftermath of the civil war, Yemeni Socialist Party leaders within Yemen reorganized the party and elected a new politburo in July 1994. However, the party remained disheartened and without its former influence. Islaah held a party convention in September 1994. The General People's Congress did the same in June 1995.

In 1994, amendments to the unity constitution eliminated the presidential council. President Ali Abdallah Saleh was elected by Parliament on 1 October 1994 to a 5-year term. The constitution provided that henceforth the President is to be elected by popular vote from at least two candidates selected by the legislature.

Aftermath
Adopting a Western style governmental system, Yemen held its first direct presidential elections in September 1999, electing President Ali Abdullah Saleh to a 5-year term in what were generally considered free and fair elections. Yemen held its second multiparty parliamentary elections in April 1997. Constitutional amendments adopted in the summer of 2000 extended the presidential term by two years, thus moving the next presidential elections to 2006. The amendments also extended the parliamentary term of office to a 6-year term, thus moving elections for these seats to 2003. On 20 February 2001, a new constitutional amendment created a bicameral legislature consisting of a Shura Council (111 seats; members appointed by the president) and a House of Representatives (301 seats; members elected by popular vote). Yemen is now a dominant-party system with the General People's Congress in power.

Friction and troubles continued, elements in the south perceive unfair treatment by the north. This has given birth to a popular movement called the South Yemen Movement which calls for the return of an independent southern state. In 2015, this time as a pawn in the proxy war between Saudi Arabia and Iran, Yemen again was engulfed in civil war, which continues to this day.

Integration
 The North Yemeni rial and the South Yemeni dinar remained legal tender during a transitional period. In 1991, the dinar was withdrawn from circulation, with 26 rial exchanged for one dinar. In 1993, the first coins were issued for the Republic of Yemen called Yemeni rials.
 The capital of the Republic of Yemen is North's old capital, Sana'a.
 The South's "United Republic" became the country's national anthem.
 September 26 and October 14 are both celebrated as Revolution Day, with the former celebrating the North's revolution against the imams and the latter celebrating the South's revolution against the British Empire.
 November 30 is celebrated as Independence Day, as it is the day the South gained independence from the British, as opposed to November 1, which was celebrated in the north as Independence Day from the Ottoman Empire.
 The Republic of Yemen kept the North's United Nations name, Yemen, as opposed to the South's Democratic Yemen.
 The Republic of Yemen accepts responsibility for all treaties and debts of its predecessors.
 The Republic of Yemen kept the South's system of Governorates (Muhafazah), and split the North's liwa (provinces) into smaller governorates, leaving the current Governorates of Yemen.
 The Republic of Yemen uses the North's calling code, +967, as opposed to the South's +969.
 The Republic of Yemen uses the North's ISO 3166-1 alphabetic codes (alpha-2: YE, alpha-3: YEM), as opposed to the South's (alpha-2: YD, alpha-3: YMD); a new numeric code was assigned for the unified country (887) to replace the old numeric codes (North: 886; South: 720), as is the custom for any merging of countries.

See also
 Southern Movement
 South Yemen insurgency
 Yemeni Socialist Party

References

External links
 Al-Bab, essays on Yemeni subjects
 Day, Stephen, Yemen on the Brink, Carnegie Endowment for International Peace, 2010

1990 in Yemen
National unifications
North Yemen
South Yemen
1990 in politics
May 1990 events in Asia